Daniel Mullen could refer to: 

Daniel Mullen (born 1989), Australian soccer player
Dan Mullen (born 1972), American football coach
Danny Mullen (born 1995), Scottish professional footballer